This was the first edition of the tournament.

Hans Podlipnik and Andrei Vasilevski won the title after defeating Roman Jebavý and Lukáš Rosol 7–5, 3–6, [16–14] in the final.

Seeds

Draw

References
 Main Draw

Koblenz Open - Doubles
2017 Doubles